A hoop skirt or hoopskirt is a women's undergarment worn in various periods to hold the skirt extended into a fashionable shape.

It originated as a modest-sized mechanism for holding long skirts away from one's legs, to stay cooler in hot climates and to keep from tripping on the skirt during various activities.  Small hoops might be worn by farmers and while working in the garden.  Hoops were then adopted as a fashion item, and the size and scale of the hoops grew in grandeur, especially during the mid-nineteenth century transition from the 1850s to the 1860s. As the society of consumerism evolved, the roles of men and women changed and so did their dress. As male dress became tailored, the female costume of the period made women practically immobilized due to the cumbersome amount of petticoats needed to suit the era's style. 

In the mid-19th century, the fashionable silhouette was a small waist with large, dome-shaped skirts. More and more petticoats were added to make the skirts appear even larger. When the circular crinoline came out in 1856, it was a revelation not only of technology but of convenience for women. The crinoline supported the weight of the numerous skirts and allowed the woman to wear fewer petticoats while still achieving the desired silhouette.The invention of the sewing machine allowed crinolines to be mass-produced at a lower cost, thus making the crinoline available for all classes.

The mania for large bell-shaped skirts phased out through the mid-1860s and slowly shifted to emphasize volume in the posterior. The crinolette came into fashion, which was basically a narrow crinoline with a flat front and cage hoops in the back.

By the 1870s, the cage of the crinolette became a cage only at the rear of the woman's undergarments. This is known today as a bustle.

Hoop skirts typically consist of a fabric petticoat sewn with channels designed to act as casings for stiffening materials, such as rope, osiers, whalebone, steel, or, from the mid-20th century, nylon. The crinoline of the mid-19th century was constructed from collapsible steel hoops. This allowed for easy storage and increased agility for the wearer.

Hoop skirts were first introduced to the United States by David Hough, Jr. in 1846.

Hoop skirts are called by various names in different periods:
Farthingale (Spanish verdugado) (16th century)
Panniers or "side hoops" (18th century)
Crinoline or crinolette (mid-19th century)

Lightweight hoop skirts, usually with nylon hoops, are worn today under very full-skirted wedding gowns. They can sometimes be seen in the gothic fashion scene.  Reproduction hoop skirts are an essential part of living history costuming, especially American Civil War reenactment.

References

Sources
Arnold, Janet: Patterns of Fashion: the cut and construction of clothes for men and women 1560-1620, Macmillan 1985. Revised edition 1986. 
Arnold, Janet: Patterns of Fashion 1 (cut and construction of women's clothing, 1660-1860), Wace 1964, Macmillan 1972. Revised metric edition, Drama Books 1977. .  
Arnold, Janet: Patterns of Fashion 2: Englishwomen's Dresses and Their Construction  1860-1940, Wace 1966, Macmillan 1972. Revised metric edition, Drama Books 1977.  
Arnold, Janet: Queen Elizabeth's Wardrobe Unlock'd, W S Maney and Son Ltd, Leeds 1988. 
Fogg, Marnie: Fashion: The Whole Story, 2013, Prestel, New York, New York, .

16th-century fashion
17th-century fashion
18th-century fashion
19th-century fashion
20th-century fashion
History of clothing (Western fashion)
Gowns
Undergarments
Skirts
Women's clothing

ms:Skirt gegelang